Maleic anhydride is an organic compound with the formula C2H2(CO)2O.  It is the acid anhydride of maleic acid. It is a colorless or white solid with an acrid odor.  It is produced industrially on a large scale for applications in coatings and polymers.

Production
Maleic anhydride is produced by vapor-phase oxidation of n-butane. The overall process converts the methyl groups to carboxylate and dehydrogenates the backbone. The selectivity of the process reflects the robustness of maleic anhydride, with its conjugated double-bond system. Traditionally maleic anhydride was produced by the oxidation of benzene or other aromatic compounds. As of 2006, only a few smaller plants continue to use benzene.

In both cases, benzene and butane are fed into a stream of hot air, and the mixture is passed through a catalyst bed at high temperature. The ratio of air to hydrocarbon is controlled to prevent the mixture from igniting. Vanadium pentoxide and molybdenum trioxide are the catalysts used for the benzene route, whereas vanadium phosphate is used for the butane route:

C4H10  + 3.5 O2  →   C4H2O3  +  4 H2O     ∆H = −1236 kJ/mol
The main competing process entails full combustion of the butane, a conversion that is twice as exothermic as the partial oxidation.

The traditional method using benzene became uneconomical due to the high and still rising benzene prices and by complying with the regulations of benzene emissions. In addition, in the production of maleic anhydride (4 C-atoms) a third of the original carbon atoms is lost as carbon dioxide when using benzene (6 carbon atoms). The modern catalytic processes start from a 4-carbon molecule and only attaches oxygen and removes water; the 4-C-base body of the molecule remains intact. Overall, the newer method is therefore more material efficient.

Parallels exist with the production of phthalic anhydride: While older methods use naphthalene, modern methods use o-xylene as feedstock.

Reactions
The chemistry of maleic anhydride is very rich, reflecting its ready availability and bifunctional reactivity. It hydrolyzes, producing maleic acid, cis-HOOC–CH=CH–COOH.  With alcohols, the half-ester is generated, e.g., cis-HOOC–CH=CH–COOCH3.

Maleic anhydride is a classic substrate for Diels-Alder reactions.  It was used for work in 1928, on the reaction between maleic anhydride and 1,3-butadiene, for which Otto Paul Hermann Diels and Kurt Alder were awarded the Nobel Prize in 1950.  It is through this reaction that maleic anhydride converted to many pesticides and pharmaceuticals. Their 1928 patent also provided many other examples of reactions involving maleic anhydride, such as the reaction with cyclopentadiene to form nadic anhydride.

Michael reaction of maleic anhydride with active methylene or methine compounds such as malonate or acetoacetate esters in the presence of sodium acetate catalyst. These intermediates were subsequently used for the generation of the Krebs cycle intermediates aconitic and isocitric acids.

Maleic anhydride dimerizes in a photochemical reaction to form cyclobutane tetracarboxylic dianhydride (CBTA). This compound is used in the production of polyimides and as an alignment film for liquid crystal displays.

It is also a ligand for low-valent metal complexes, examples being Pt(PPh3)2(MA) and Fe(CO)4(MA).

On account of its cycle of 4 π electrons in an array of 5 atoms with p orbitals, maleic anhydride was long thought to exhibit antiaromaticity.  However, a thermochemical study concluded that only 8 kJ/mol of destabilization energy can be ascribed to this effect, making it weakly antiaromatic at best.

Uses
Maleic anhydride is used in many applications.

Plastics & resins 
Around 50% of world maleic anhydride output is used in the manufacture of unsaturated polyester resins (UPR). Chopped glass fibers are added to UPR to produce fiberglass reinforced plastics that are used in a wide range of applications such as pleasure boats, bathroom fixtures, automobiles, tanks and pipes.

Maleic anhydride is hydrogenated to 1,4-butanediol (BDO), used in the production of thermoplastic polyurethanes, elastane/Spandex fibers, polybutylene terephthalate (PBT) resins and many other products.

Curing agents 
 

Diels-Alder reaction of maleic anhydride and butadiene and isoprene gives the respective tetrahydrophthalic anhydrides which can be hydrogenated to the corresponding hexahydrophthalic anhydrides.  These species are used as curing agents in epoxy resins. Another market for maleic anhydride is lubricating oil additives, which are used in gasoline and diesel engine crankcase oils as dispersants and corrosion inhibitors. Changes in lubricant specifications and more efficient engines have had a negative effect on the demand for lubricating oil additives, giving flat growth prospects for maleic anhydride in this application.

Others 
A number of smaller applications for maleic anhydride. The food industry uses malic acid which is derivative of maleic anhydride in artificial sweeteners and flavour enhancements. Personal care products consuming maleic anhydride include hair sprays, adhesives and floor polishes. Maleic anhydride is also a precursor to compounds used for water treatment detergents, insecticides and fungicides, pharmaceuticals, and other copolymers.

Major producers

Source: Kirk & Othmer

Solid State Chemicals, Ltd. started production of solid maleic anhydride pastilles in the USA in 2014.

World Maleic Anhydride Capacity By Region
Data in: kilotonnes per annum

Source: Kirk & Othmer

Packing and transport
Liquid maleic anhydride is available in road tankers and/or tank-containers which are made of stainless steel, which are insulated and provided with heating systems to maintain the temperature of 65-75 °C. Tank cars must be approved for the transport of molten maleic anhydride.

Liquid/molten maleic anhydride is a dangerous material in accordance with RID/ADR.

Solid maleic anhydride pellets are transported by trucks. Packaging is generally in 25 kg polyethylene bags.

Effects on human health and the environment
This compound poses relatively low-risk environmental hazards, an important feature for some applications.  In humans, exposure to maleic anhydride may cause irritation to the respiratory tract, eyes, exposed mucosa, and skin.  Maleic anhydride is also a skin and respiratory sensitizer.

Maleic anhydride is a low hazard profile chemical.  Maleic anhydride rapidly hydrolyzes to form maleic acid in the presence of water and hence environmental exposures to maleic anhydride itself are unlikely. Maleic acid is biodegradable under aerobic conditions in sewage sludge as well as in soil and water.

Food starch for use in night markets sold from a supplier in Tainan city, Taiwan, were found to contain maleic anhydride in December 2013. The supplier was investigated regarding the 300 tons of tainted starch; an earlier inspection in November had found 32 tons.

References

External links

Chronic toxicity summary
Maleic anhydride at Occupational Safety & Health Administration

Carboxylic anhydrides